Paraterellia is a genus of tephritid  or fruit flies in the family Tephritidae.

Species
The genus contains the following species.

 Paraterellia immaculata
 Paraterellia superba
 Paraterellia varipennis
 Paraterellia ypsilon

References

Trypetinae
Tephritidae genera